The 2023 Idaho Vandals football team will represent the University of Idaho in the Big Sky Conference during the 2023 NCAA Division I FCS football season. Led by second-year head coach Jason Eck, the Vandels play their home games on campus at the Kibbie Dome in Moscow, Idaho.

Previous season

The Vandels finished the 2022 season with an overall record of 7–5 and a mark of 6–2 in conference play to place in a tie for third in the Big Sky. They lost to Southeastern Louisiana 45–42 in the NCAA Division I First Round

Schedule

References

Idaho
Idaho Vandals football seasons
Idaho Vandals football